The Last Temptation of Christ is a 1988 epic religious drama film directed by Martin Scorsese. Written by Paul Schrader with uncredited rewrites from Scorsese and Jay Cocks, it is an adaptation of Nikos Kazantzakis' controversial 1955 novel of the same name. The film, starring Willem Dafoe, Harvey Keitel, Barbara Hershey, Andre Gregory, Harry Dean Stanton and David Bowie, was shot entirely in Morocco.

The film depicts the life of Jesus Christ and his struggle with various forms of temptation including fear, doubt, depression, reluctance and lust. The book and the film depict Christ being tempted by imagining himself engaged in sexual activities, which caused outrage from some Christians. It includes a disclaimer stating "This film is not based on the Gospels, but upon the fictional exploration of the eternal spiritual conflict."

Like the novel it was based on, the film generated controversy from Christian religious groups at the time of its release, who took issue with its departures from the Gospel narratives. It received positive reviews from critics and some religious leaders, and Scorsese received a nomination for the Academy Award for Best Director. Hershey's performance as Mary Magdalene earned her a nomination for the Golden Globe for Best Supporting Actress. Peter Gabriel's music score also received acclaim, including a nomination for the Golden Globe Award for Best Original Score. Dafoe's performance as Jesus was praised, with some thinking he should have been nominated for Best Actor. In stark contrast, Keitel's performance as Judas Iscariot was not well received and he was nominated for Worst Supporting Actor at the Golden Raspberry Awards.

Plot
Jesus of Nazareth, a carpenter in Roman-occupied Judea, is torn between his own desires and his knowledge of God's plan for him. His friend Judas Iscariot is sent to kill him for collaborating with the Romans to crucify Jewish rebels, but suspects that Jesus is the Messiah and asks him to lead a war of liberation against the Romans. While Jesus assures him that his message is one of love for mankind, Judas warns him not to harm the rebellion.

Jesus starts preaching after saving prostitute Mary Magdalene from a stoning and being baptized by John the Baptist. He acquires disciples, some who want freedom from the Romans while Jesus maintains people should tend to matters of the spirit. Jesus goes into the desert to test his connection to God, where he resists temptation by Satan. Returning from the desert, Jesus is nursed back to health by Martha and Mary of Bethany, who encourage him to marry and have children. 

After performing miracles, including raising Lazarus from the dead, Jesus's ministry reaches Jerusalem, where he chases out money lenders from the temple. He begins bleeding from his hands, which he recognizes as a sign that he must die on the cross to bring salvation to mankind and instructs Judas to give him to the Romans. Jesus convenes his disciples for a Passover seder, whereupon Judas leads a contingent of soldiers to arrest Jesus in the garden of Gethsemane. Pontius Pilate tells Jesus that he must be put to death as he represents a threat to the Roman Empire; he is subsequently flogged, mocked and taken to be crucified.

While on the cross, a young lady who claims to be Jesus's guardian angel tells him that, while he is the Son of God, he is not the Messiah and that God is pleased with him and wants him to be happy. She brings him down off the cross and, invisible to others, takes him to Mary Magdalene, whom he marries. They live a happy life, but when she abruptly dies, Jesus is consoled by his angel and goes on to start a family with Mary and Martha, the sisters of Lazarus. As an older man, Jesus encounters the apostle Paul preaching about the Messiah and tries to tell him that he is the man about whom Paul has been preaching. Paul repudiates him, saying that even if Jesus had not died on the cross, his message was the truth, and nothing would stop him from proclaiming that. Jesus debates him, stating that salvation cannot be founded on lies.

Near the end of his life, with Jerusalem in the throes of rebellion, an elderly dying Jesus calls his former disciples to his bed. When Judas comes he reveals Jesus's guardian angel is actually Satan, who tricked him into believing he did not have to give himself up to save the world. Crawling back through the burning city, Jesus reaches the site of his crucifixion and begs God to let him fulfill his purpose, stating "I want to be the Messiah!" Jesus then finds himself once more on the cross, having overcome the "last temptation" of escaping death, being married and raising a family, and the ensuing disaster that would have consequently encompassed mankind. Jesus cries out "It is accomplished!" and dies.

Cast

 Willem Dafoe as Jesus
 Harvey Keitel as Judas Iscariot
 Barbara Hershey as Mary Magdalene
 Harry Dean Stanton as Saul/Paul of Tarsus
 David Bowie as Pontius Pilate
 Steve Shill as Centurion
 Verna Bloom as Mary, mother of Jesus
 Roberts Blossom as Aged Master
 Barry Miller as Jeroboam
 Gary Basaraba as Andrew
 Irvin Kershner as Zebedee
 Victor Argo as Peter
 Paul Herman as Philip
 John Lurie as James
 Michael Been as John
 Leo Burmester as Nathaniel
 Andre Gregory as John the Baptist
 Tomas Arana as Lazarus
 Alan Rosenberg as Thomas
 Nehemiah Persoff as Rabbi
 Peter Berling as Beggar
 Leo Marks as Voice of Satan
 Juliette Caton as Girl Angel
 Martin Scorsese (uncredited) as Isaiah
 Peggy Gormley as Martha
 Randy Danson as Mary

Production
Scorsese had wanted to make a film version of Jesus' life since childhood. While he was directing Barbara Hershey in the 1972 film Boxcar Bertha, she gave him a copy of the Kazantzakis novel. Scorsese optioned the novel in the late 1970s, and he gave it to Paul Schrader to adapt. The Last Temptation of Christ was originally to be Scorsese's follow-up to The King of Comedy; production was slated to begin in 1983 for Paramount, with a budget of about $14 million and shot on location in Israel. The original cast included Aidan Quinn as Jesus, Sting as Pontius Pilate, Ray Davies as Judas Iscariot, and Vanity as Mary Magdalene. Management at Paramount and its then parent company, Gulf+Western grew uneasy due to the ballooning budget for the picture and protest letters received from religious groups. The project went into turnaround and was finally canceled in December 1983. Scorsese went on to make After Hours instead.

In 1986, Universal Studios became interested in the project. Scorsese offered to shoot the film in 58 days for $7 million, and Universal eventually greenlighted the production as Scorsese agreed to direct a more mainstream film for the studio in the future (it eventually resulted in Cape Fear). Critic and screenwriter Jay Cocks worked with Scorsese to revise Schrader's script. Aidan Quinn passed on the role of Jesus, and Scorsese recast Willem Dafoe in the part. Sting also passed on the role of Pilate, with the role being recast with David Bowie. Principal photography began in October 1987. The location shoot in Morocco (a first for Scorsese) was difficult, and the difficulties were compounded by the hurried schedule. "We worked in a state of emergency," Scorsese recalled. Scenes had to be improvised and worked out on the set with little deliberation, leading Scorsese to develop a minimalist aesthetic for the film. Shooting wrapped by December 25, 1987.

Music
The film's musical soundtrack, composed by Peter Gabriel, received a Golden Globe Award nomination for Best Original Score - Motion Picture in 1988 and was released on CD with the title Passion, which won a Grammy in 1990 for Best New Age Album. The film's score itself helped to popularize world music. Gabriel subsequently compiled an album called Passion – Sources, including additional material by various musicians that inspired him in composing the soundtrack, or which he sampled for the soundtrack. The original scores brought together many international artists including Pakistani Musician and vocalist Nusrat Fateh Ali Khan, Egyptian Kanun player Abdul Aziz, Turkish Ney flute player Kudsi Ergüner,  Armenian Doudouk players Antranik Askarian and Vatche Housepian.

Release
The film opened on August 12, 1988. The film was later screened as a part of the Venice International Film Festival on September 7, 1988. In response to the film's acceptance as a part of the film festival's lineup, director Franco Zeffirelli removed his film Young Toscanini from the program.

Although The Last Temptation of Christ was released on VHS and Laserdisc, many video rental stores, including the then-dominant Blockbuster Video, declined to carry it for rental as a result of the film's controversial reception. In 1997, the Criterion Collection issued a special edition of The Last Temptation of Christ on Laserdisc, which Criterion re-issued on DVD in 2000 and on Blu-ray disc in Region A in March 2012 and Region B in April 2019.

Reception

Box office
The Last Temptation of Christ opened in 123 theaters on August 12, 1988, in the United States and Canada, and grossed $401,211 in its opening weekend. At the end of its run, it had grossed $8,373,585 in the United States and Canada. Internationally it grossed $25.4 million for a worldwide total of $33.8 million.

Critical response
The review aggregator website Rotten Tomatoes reports that 82% of 103 film critics have given the film a positive review, with an average rating of 7.6/10. The consensus states, "Contrary to accusations of irreverence, The Last Temptation of Christs biggest sins are actually languid pacing and some tinny dialogue—but Martin Scorsese's passion for the subject shines through in an oft-transcendent rumination on faith." Metacritic, which assigns a weighted average score out of 100 to reviews from mainstream critics, gives the film a score of 80 based on 18 reviews, indicating "generally favorable reviews".

In a four-out-of-four star review for the Chicago Sun-Times, Roger Ebert, who later included the film in his list of "Great Movies", wrote that Scorsese and screenwriter Paul Schrader "paid Christ the compliment of taking him and his message seriously, and they have made a film that does not turn him into a garish, emasculated image from a religious postcard. Here he is flesh and blood, struggling, questioning, asking himself and his father which is the right way, and finally, after great suffering, earning the right to say, on the cross, 'It is accomplished.'" Gene Siskel from the Chicago Tribune said "Dafoe manages to draw us into the mystery, anguish and joy of the holy life. This is anything but another one of those boring biblical costume epics. There is genuine challenge and hope in this movie."

A review associated with Catholic News Service asserts that The Last Temptation of Christ   "fails because of artistic inadequacy rather than anti-religious bias." Halliwell's Film Guide awarded it one star from a possible four, describing it as "beautifully shot and strikingly acted, but wordy and too long". Alan Jones awarded it four stars out of five for Radio Times, calling it "a challenging essay on the life of Jesus" and "neither blasphemous nor offensive", though he felt it was "slightly too long, and Scorsese does pull some punches in deference to the subject matter", but described these as "minor criticisms" and concluded that it was a "sincere work".

Controversy

Terrorist attack

On October 22, 1988, an Integralist Catholic group set fire to the Saint Michel cinema in Paris while it was showing the film. Shortly after midnight, an incendiary device ignited under a seat in the less supervised underground room, where a different film was being shown. The incendiary device consisted of a charge of potassium chlorate, triggered by a vial containing sulphuric acid. The attack injured thirteen people, four of whom were severely burned, and severely damaged the cinema.

Death threats 
In Roger Ebert's book Scorsese by Ebert, the critic wrote of the reaction to The Last Temptation of Christ, "...Scorsese was targeted by death threats and the jeremiads of TV evangelists". The threats were significant enough that Scorsese had to use bodyguards during public appearances for a few years.

Protests
Because of the film's departures from the gospel narratives—and especially a brief scene wherein Jesus and Mary Magdalene consummate their marriage—several Christian groups organized vocal protests and boycotts of the film prior to and upon its release. One protest, organized by a religious Californian radio station, gathered 600 protesters to picket the headquarters of Universal Studios' then parent company MCA. One of the protestors dressed up as MCA's Chairman Lew Wasserman and pretended to drive nails through Jesus' hands into a wooden cross. Evangelist Bill Bright offered to buy the film's negative from Universal in order to destroy it. The protests were effective in convincing several theater chains not to screen the film. One of those chains, General Cinemas, later apologized to Scorsese for doing so.

Censorship and bans 
Mother Angelica, a Catholic nun and founder of Eternal Word Television Network, described Last Temptation as "the most blasphemous ridicule of the Eucharist that's ever been perpetrated in this world" and "a holocaust movie that has the power to destroy souls eternally." In some countries, including Greece, South Africa, Turkey, Mexico, Chile, and Argentina, the film was banned or censored for several years. As of July 2010, the film continued to be banned in the Philippines and Singapore. In February 2020, Netflix revealed the film to be one of the five titles that have been removed from the Singapore version of Netflix at the demand of the Singapore government's Infocomm Media Development Authority.

Awards and nominations

Notes

References

Further reading 

Pictures of opening day protests against "Last Temptation of Christ" at Wide Angle/Closeup
 "Identity and Ethnicity in Peter Gabriel's Sound Track for The Last Temptation of Christ'' by Eftychia Papanikolaou; chapter in Scandalizing Jesus?: Kazantzakis's 'The Last Temptation of Christ' Fifty Years On, edited by Darren J. N. Middleton, with a contribution by Martin Scorsese, 217–228. New York and London: Continuum, 2005.
 The Last Temptation of Christ: Passion Project an essay by David Ehrenstein at the Criterion Collection
 Personal Jesus an essay by Bruce Bennett at the Criterion Collection

External links

 
 
 

1988 films
1988 controversies
1988 drama films
1980s American films
1980s Canadian films
1980s English-language films
Adaptations of works by Nikos Kazantzakis
Alliance Atlantis films
American drama films
American epic films
American independent films
Canadian drama films
Canadian epic films
Canadian independent films
Censored films
Christianity in popular culture controversies
Cultural depictions of John the Baptist
Cultural depictions of Judas Iscariot
Cultural depictions of Paul the Apostle
Cultural depictions of Pontius Pilate
Cultural depictions of Saint Peter
The Devil in film
English-language Canadian films
Film controversies
Film portrayals of Jesus' death and resurrection
Film controversies in Argentina
Film controversies in France
Film controversies in Mexico
Film controversies in the Philippines
Film controversies in the United States
Film censorship in the United States
Film censorship in France
Films about Christianity
Films based on Greek novels
Films directed by Martin Scorsese
Films scored by Peter Gabriel
Films shot in Morocco
Films with screenplays by Paul Schrader
Obscenity controversies in film
Portrayals of Jesus in film
Portrayals of Mary Magdalene in film
Portrayals of the Virgin Mary in film
Religious controversies in film
Religious controversies in the United States
Religious controversies in France
Religious drama films
Religious epic films
Universal Pictures films